
On 30 November 2007, the business leaders of 150 global companies published a communiqué to world leaders calling for a comprehensive, legally binding United Nations framework to tackle climate change.

The initiative represents an unprecedented coming together of the international business community and includes some of the biggest companies and brands from around the world, including the United States, Europe, Australia and China.

It has been led by The Prince of Wales’s UK and EU Corporate Leaders Groups on Climate Change , which are developed and run by the Cambridge Programme for Sustainability Leadership.

It was hoped that the Bali Communiqué would have a significant impact on the UN climate negotiations starting on 3 December 2007 in Bali, Indonesia (see 2007 United Nations Climate Change Conference).

The Bali Communiqué calls for:

a comprehensive, legally binding United Nations framework to tackle climate change 
emission reduction targets to be guided primarily by science 
those countries that have already industrialised to make the greatest effort 
world leaders to seize the window of opportunity and agree on a work plan of negotiations to ensure an agreement can come into force after 2012 (when the existing Kyoto Protocol expires)

Text 
The Bali Communiqué reads as follows:

See also 
Bali roadmap

References 

History of Bali
Environmental treaties
Proposed treaties
Climate change policy
2007 in the environment